The 2006–07 Wisconsin Badgers men's basketball team represented the University of Wisconsin–Madison in the 2006–07 NCAA Division I men's basketball season. The head coach was Bo Ryan, coaching his sixth season with the Badgers. The team played their home games at the Kohl Center in Madison, Wisconsin as a member of the Big Ten Conference. The Badgers finished the season 30–6, 13–3 in Big Ten play to finish in second place. They lost in the Big Ten tournament championship to Ohio State. They received an at-large bid to the NCAA tournament as a No. 2 seed in the Midwest Region. In the First Round, they defeated Texas A&M–Corpus Christi before being upset by No. 7-seeded UNLV in the Second Round.

Season Notes 
Alando Tucker was a senior and won Big Ten Player of the Year in voting by both the coaches and the media. He averaged 19.9 point per game. He was a 1st team consensus All-American, and was a Wooden Award finalist but the award went to a freshman from Texas, Kevin Durant. Kammron Taylor was also a senior. Brian Butch, Greg Stiemsma, and Michael Flowers were juniors.

The season was a promising one as Wisconsin beat then-ranked #2 Pittsburgh in December, and then-ranked #5 Ohio State in January. Wisconsin earned its first ever #1 AP ranking in school history on February 20, 2007. However, the Badgers lost that same evening at Michigan State. An important rematch with Ohio State loomed a few days later on Sunday, February 25, 2007 in Columbus.The Buckeyes, boasting an elite freshman class lead by Mike Conley and Greg Oden, edged the Badgers, 49-48. In that game, junior center Brian Butch severely injured his elbow and missed the rest of Wisconsin's season.

Losing Butch was a large blow to Wisconsin, who despite making it to the Big Ten championship game, still limped into March Madness as a 2-seed. The team struggled to close out 15-seed Texas A&M-Corpus Christi in the first round before getting ousted by 7-seed UNLV in the second round. Meanwhile, Ohio State advanced to the NCAA Tournament finale before falling to Florida, which repeated as champion.

Awards
All-Big Ten by Media
 Alando Tucker - 1st team (unanimous)
 Kammron Taylor - 2nd team
 Michael Flowers - Honorable mention

All-Big Ten by Coaches
 Alando Tucker - 1st team (unanimous)
 Kammron Taylor - 2nd team
 Brian Butch - Honorable mention
 Michael Flowers - All-Defensive team

Previous season 
The Badgers finished the 2005–06 season 19–12, 9–7 in Big Ten play to finish in tie for fourth place. They lost to Indiana in the quarterfinals of the Big Ten tournament. The Badgers received an at-large bid to the NCAA tournament as a No. 9 seed in the Minneapolis region. They lost in the First Round to No. 8-seeded Arizona.

Roster

Schedule

|-
!colspan=9 style=| Non-conference regular season

|-
!colspan=9 style=|Big Ten regular season

|-
!colspan=9 style=|Big Ten tournament

|- 
!colspan=9 style=|NCAA tournament

References

Wisconsin Badgers men's basketball seasons
Wisconsin
Wisconsin
Badge
Badge